
Gmina Pasym is an urban-rural gmina (administrative district) in Szczytno County, Warmian-Masurian Voivodeship, in northern Poland.

Villages
Apart from the town of Pasym, Gmina Pasym contains the villages and settlements of Dybowo, Dźwiersztyny, Elganowo, Grom, Grzegrzółki, Jurgi, Krzywonoga, Leleszki, Łysa Góra, Michałki, Miłuki, Narajty, Otole, Pasym-Kolonie, Rudziska Pasymskie, Rusek Wielki, Rutki, Siedliska, Słonecznik, Tylkówek and Tylkowo.

Neighbouring gminas
Gmina Pasym is bordered by the gminas of Dźwierzuty, Jedwabno, Purda and Szczytno.

References
Polish official population figures 2006

Pasym
Szczytno County